John Anderson may refer to:

Business
John Anderson (Scottish businessman) (1747–1820), Scottish merchant and founder of Fermoy, Ireland
John Byers Anderson (1817–1897), American educator, military officer and railroad executive, mentor of Andrew Carnegie
John Macvicar Anderson (1835–1915), Scottish architect
John Anderson (publisher) (1836–1910), Norwegian-American publisher
John Anderson (merchant) (1852–1924), Scottish merchant, of Singapore and Eastcote
Sir John Anderson, 1st Baronet, of Harrold Priory (1878–1963), Scottish haulage contractor
John E. Anderson (1917–2011), American businessman, namesake of the UCLA Anderson School of Management
John Anderson (New Zealand businessman, born 1938), New Zealand businessman, founder of Contiki Holidays and professional public speaker
Jock R. Anderson (born 1941), Australian agricultural economist
John Anderson (inventor) (1942–2012), founder, director and the chief technology officer of HeartSine Technologies
John Anderson (New Zealand businessman, born 1945) (1945–2018), chief executive of the ANZ National Bank in New Zealand
John Anderson (chairman), non-executive chairman of the North-East Business and Innovation Centre, Sunderland
John L. Anderson (shipbuilder) (1868–1941) Seattle steamboat pioneer and shipbuilder

Entertainment

Music
 John Anderson (jazz trumpeter) (1921–1974), American jazz musician
 Jon Anderson (John Roy Anderson, born 1944), lead singer of the British band Yes
 John Anderson (producer) (born 1948), Northern Irish composer and producer
 John Anderson (musician) (born 1954), American country musician
 John Anderson (album), Anderson's 1980 debut album
 John Anderson, vocalist for the British rock band Charlie (founded 1971)

Theater, television and film
 John Murray Anderson (1886–1954), Newfoundland-American theater director
 John Anderson (actor) (1922–1992), American actor
 John Anderson (New Zealand actor) (1943–2016), New Zealand actor and director
 John Anderson (TV personality) (born 1931), Scottish television personality, referee on the series Gladiators
 John Anderson (sportscaster) (born 1965), American ESPN television sports journalist and co-host of Wipeout
 John H. Anderson, American set decorator
 John Anderson (director) (born 1954), American documentary film director, producer, editor and writer

Writing
 J. Redwood Anderson (1883–1964), English poet
 John J. Anderson (1956–1989), writer and editor covering computers and technology
 John David Anderson (born 1975), American writer

Other entertainment
 John Henry Anderson (1814–1874), Scottish magician
 John Alvin Anderson (1869–1948), Swedish-American photographer
 John Cornbread Anderson, American folk artist

Military
John Byers Anderson (1817–1897), educator, railroad contractor and United States Army officer
John F. Anderson (general) (1832–1902), brigadier general during the American Civil War
John B. Anderson (United States Army officer) (1891–1976), American general
John W. Anderson (sailor) (1899–1976), Master Mariner and Commodore, United States Lines, Captain, SS United States
John Anderson (British Army officer) (1908–1988), first commander of the Ulster Defence Regiment
John Evelyn Anderson (1916–2007), British Army officer
John Anderson (VC) (1918–1943), English Victoria Cross recipient
John Rogers Anderson (born 1941), Canadian admiral and ambassador to NATO

Politics

Australia
John Gerard Anderson (1836–1911), Scottish-born educationalist and public servant in colonial Queensland
John Anderson (Australian politician) (born 1956), Deputy Prime Minister of Australia and Leader of the National Party 1999–2005

Canada
John Hawkins Anderson (1805–1870), member of the Canadian Senate
John Anderson (Newfoundland politician) (1855–1930), Newfoundland businessman and politician
John Victor Anderson (1918–1982), Canadian politician in Alberta

New Zealand
John Anderson (mayor) (1820–1897), mayor of Christchurch, New Zealand, blacksmith, engineer, businessman
Crawford Anderson (John Crawford Anderson, c. 1848–1930), New Zealand politician, MP for Bruce electorate

United Kingdom
Sir John Anderson, 1st Baronet, of Mill Hill (died 1813), British politician, MP for City of London, 1793–1806
John Anderson (diplomatic writer) (1795–1845), Scottish diplomatic writer
John Anderson (colonial administrator) (1858–1918), British governor of Straits Settlements and later of Ceylon
John Anderson, 1st Viscount Waverley (1882–1958), British civil servant and politician
John Anderson, 3rd Viscount Waverley (born 1949), British peer
John Anderson (trade unionist), British trade union leader

United States
Jack Z. Anderson (1904–1981), United States Representative from California
John Alexander Anderson (1834–1892), United States Representative from Kansas
John Anderson (Maine politician) (1792–1853), United States Representative from Maine
John Anderson (New Jersey politician) (1665–1736), colonel who served as acting governor of New Jersey in 1736
John Anderson (Wisconsin senator) (1870–1954), Wisconsin state senator
John Anderson Jr. (1917–2014), Governor of Kansas, 1961–1965
John B. Anderson (1922–2017), United States Representative from Illinois and 1980 presidential candidate
John C. Anderson (lawyer) (born 1975), United States Attorney for the District of New Mexico
John C. Anderson (Wisconsin politician) (1862–1???), Wisconsin state assemblyman
John C. Anderson (Pennsylvania politician) (19??–1983), member of Philadelphia city council
John Hope Anderson (1912–2005), American politician in Pennsylvania
John N. Anderson, American politician in California
John T. Anderson (1804–1879), American politician in Virginia
Johnny Anderson (politician), member of the Utah House of Representatives

Religion and philosophy
John Anderson (theologian and controversialist) (1668–1721), Scottish theologian and controversialist
John Anderson (theologian) (1748–1830), founder of the first Presbyterian seminary in America
John Anderson (missionary) (1805–1855), Scottish missionary
John Hendry Anderson (1854–1913), Anglican rector and instigator of Tooting Bec Lido
John Anderson (archbishop of Moosonee) (1866–1943), Anglican Church of Canada metropolitan bishop
John Anderson (philosopher) (1893–1962), Australian philosopher
John Mueller Anderson (1914–1999), American philosopher
John Anderson (bishop of British Columbia) (1912–1969), Anglican Church of Canada bishop

Science
John Anderson (natural philosopher) (1726–1796), Scottish natural philosopher
John Anderson (physician) (died 1804), English physician
John Anderson (zoologist) (1833–1900), Scottish zoologist
John Anderson (New Zealand engineer) (1849–1934), Scottish rugby union player and engineer
John Anderson (Scottish engineer) (1814–1886)
John F. Anderson (scientist) (1873–1958), director of the United States Hygienic Laboratory
John August Anderson (1876–1959), American physicist and astronomer
John Edward Anderson (psychologist) (1893–1966), American psychologist
John Stuart Anderson (1908–1990), British/Australian inorganic chemist
John Anderson (pathologist) (1918–2011), British pathologist
J. Edward Anderson (born 1927), American engineer
John Maxwell Anderson (1928–1982), Scottish surgeon and cancer specialist
John Robert Anderson (chemist) (1928–2007), Australian chemist/materials scientist
John D. Anderson (born 1937), American aerospace engineer
John L. Anderson (born 1945), American chemical engineer
John Robert Anderson (psychologist) (born 1947), Canadian psychologist and computer scientist
John G. Anderson (born 1948), seismologist

Sports

American football
John E. Anderson (American football), American college football player and coach
John W. Anderson (American football) (1933–1998), American football coach
John Anderson (American football) (born 1956), Green Bay Packers linebacker

Association football
John Anderson (footballer, born 1878) (1878–1???), English footballer who played for Woolwich Arsenal and Portsmouth
John Anderson (footballer, born 1879) (1879–1???), Scottish footballer who played for Chesterfield Town
John Anderson (footballer, born 1881) (1881–1942), Scottish footballer who played for Heart of Midothian and Falkirk
John Anderson (footballer, born 1915) (1915–1987), Scottish footballer, scorer for Portsmouth in the 1939 FA Cup Final
John Anderson (footballer, born 1921) (1921–2006), English footballer, scorer for Manchester United in the 1948 FA Cup Final
John Anderson (footballer, born 1928) (1928–2001), Scottish footballer who played as an inside forward
Johnny Anderson (footballer) (1929–2001), Scottish footballer who most notably played for Leicester City
John Anderson (footballer, born 1931) (1931–2003), English footballer who played for Grimsby Town
John Anderson (soccer, born 1937), Scottish-born footballer who played for Stoke City and Australia
John Anderson (footballer, born 1959), Irish international footballer who played for Newcastle United
John Anderson (footballer, born 1972), Scottish footballer best known for playing for Greenock Morton

Baseball and cricket
John Anderson (outfielder) (1873–1949), American baseball player
John Anderson (pitcher) (1929–1998), American baseball player
John Anderson (baseball coach) (born 1955), American baseball coach
John Anderson (cricketer, born 1955), Australian cricketer
John Anderson (Irish cricketer) (born 1982), Irish cricketer

Other sports
John Anderson (Australian footballer) (1888–1957), Australian rules footballer
John Anderson (discus thrower) (1907–1948), American Olympic discus thrower
John Anderson (runner) (born 1936), British runner
John Anderson (bowls) (born 1912), British-South African lawn bowler
John Anderson (rugby league) (1913–1984), New Zealand international
John Anderson (canoeist) (1924–2001), American sprint canoer
John Anderson (ice hockey general manager) (1934–2009), general manager of the Buffalo Sabres
John Anderson (sailor) (born 1939), Australian sailor
John Scott Anderson (sailor) (born 1954), Australian sailor
John Anderson (racing driver) (1944–1986), American driver, who is known for a crash at Daytona in 1981
John Anderson (ice hockey) (born 1957), Canadian ice hockey player
John Anderson (equestrian) (born 1966), Canadian Olympic equestrian
John Anderson (hurler) (born 1978), Irish hurler
John Anderson (water polo), Canadian water polo player

Others
 John Anderson (carpenter) (1759–1832), friend of Robert Burns
 John Anderson (engraver) (1775–1???), Scottish engraver
 John Anderson (genealogist, 1789–1832), Scottish genealogist
 John Anderson (genealogist, 1798–1839), Scottish genealogist
 John C. Anderson (judge) (1863–1940), Associate Justice and Chief Justice of the Alabama Supreme Court
 John W. Anderson (Iowa judge), justice of the Iowa Supreme Court
 John Anderson (classicist) (1870–1952), Camden Professor of Ancient History at the University of Oxford
 John Mathieson Anderson (born 1941), British linguist and Emeritus Professor of English Language at the University of Edinburgh
 John Anderson (escaped slave), American slave who escaped to Canada in the 1860s, leading to a famous extradition case

See also
Jack Anderson (disambiguation)
John Andersson, Swedish footballer
John Anderton (disambiguation)
Jon Anderson (disambiguation)